Fincastle is a census-designated place and unincorporated community in Campbell County, Tennessee, United States. Its population was 1,618 as of the 2010 census.

Once known as Glade Springs, Fincastle was later named for Fincastle, Virginia, which was the original home of many of its early settlers.

Geography
Fincastle is located along State Route 63 northeast of LaFollette and southwest of Speedwell in the Powell Valley.  Cumberland Mountain rises prominently to the north, and Norris Lake lies a few miles to the south.

Demographics

2020 census

As of the 2020 United States census, there were 1,611 people, 597 households, and 361 families residing in the CDP.

References

External links

Census-designated places in Campbell County, Tennessee
Census-designated places in Tennessee
Unincorporated communities in Tennessee